Events from the year 1925 in Argentina

Incumbents
 President: Marcelo Torcuato de Alvear
 Vice president: Elpidio González

Governors
 Buenos Aires Province: José Luis Cantilo 
 Cordoba: Julio A. Roca, Jr. then Ramón J. Cárcano
 Mendoza Province: Enrique Mosca

Vice Governors
 Buenos Aires Province: Emilio Solanet

Events
14 January – Captain Roig and his group of three biplanes Bréguet XIV Renault, land in Buenos Aires on a reconnaissance flight from Rio de Janeiro, to demonstrate the viability of a regular air mail service along the Buenos Aires – Bahía Blanca – Comodoro Rivadavia route.
date unknown – Dancer La Argentina begins her career performing in Europe.

Births
25 May – José María Gatica, boxer (died 1963)
17 October – Paco Jamandreu, fashion designerdied 1995)
19 October – Emilio Eduardo Massera, military officer (died 2010) 
Unknown date – Mario Passano, film actor and tango performer (died 1995)

Deaths
31 October – José Ingenieros, physician and philosopher (born 1877)

See also
 Argentine legislative election, 1924

References

 
Years of the 20th century in Argentina